Falls Mill is an unincorporated community along U.S. Route 19 and West Virginia Route 4 in Braxton County, West Virginia, United States. The community is named for the nearby falls on the Little Kanawha River, where a mill formerly stood. The falls now mark the upstream limit of Burnsville Lake.

References 

Unincorporated communities in West Virginia
Unincorporated communities in Braxton County, West Virginia